The Centre for European Reform (CER) is a London-based think tank that focuses on matters of European integration. It is a prominent source of ideas and commentary in debates about a wide range of EU-related issues, both in the United Kingdom and in the European Union. In 2021 it was ranking 58th among the top think tanks worldwide (non-US) in the Global Go To Think Tank Index Report published by the Think Tanks and Civil Societies Program.

Background and activity

CER was founded in 1996. Charles Grant, a journalist at The Economist, left his position there in 1998 to work at CER on a full-time basis, and has led the organization since then.

See also
 Bruegel (think tank)
 Centre for European Policy Studies
 European Policy Centre

Notes

European integration think tanks
Political and economic think tanks based in Europe
Think tanks based in the United Kingdom
Think tanks established in 1996